Chaka Traorè (born 23 December 2004) is an Ivorian professional footballer who plays as a winger for Italian club AC Milan U19.

Professional career
Traorè made his professional debut with Parma in a 2-1 Coppa Italia loss to Lazio on 21 January 2021. On 10 April 2021 he made his Serie A debut in a 1-3 loss against AC Milan; he also became the first 2004-born player to play in Serie A.

On 30 August 2021 he moved to Serie A club AC Milan, immediately  joining the youth sector roster.

Personal life
Born in Ivory Coast, he moved to Italy where he grew up.

In 2015 he took a small boat from Africa's north coast with the aim to reach Italy. Once in Italy, Traorè and his agent, who was later found guilty of assisting illegal immigration, were headed to Parma. Traorè was traveling under a false name and was listed as Cissè in his passport. In Italy, the then 11-year-old took on various part-time jobs to survive before he finally was discovered by U.S. Audace—a prominent academy club in the provincial capital.

References

External links
 
 Serie A profile

2004 births
Living people
Ivorian footballers
Serie A players
A.C. Milan players
Parma Calcio 1913 players
Association football wingers
Ivorian expatriate footballers
Ivorian expatriate sportspeople in Italy
Expatriate footballers in Italy
People from Abengourou